Rudolf Carl (19 June 189915 January 1987) was an Austrian actor who appeared in more than 150 German language films between 1934 and 1969. He also directed two films Der Leberfleck and Dort in der Wachau.

Selected filmography
 Polish Blood (1934)
 Frasquita (1934)
 A Star Fell from Heaven (1934)
 The Young Baron Neuhaus (1934)
 Little Mother (1935)
 Suburban Cabaret (1935)
 Heaven on Earth (1935)
 Dance Music (1935)
 The Cossack and the Nightingale (1935)
 Hannerl and Her Lovers (1936)
 Where the Lark Sings (1936)
 The Postman from Longjumeau (1936)
 The Love of the Maharaja (1936)
 Adventure in Warsaw (1937)
 The Vagabonds (1937)
 Little County Court (1938)
 Woman in the River (1939)
 Immortal Waltz (1939)
 Linen from Ireland (1939)
 Roses in Tyrol (1940)
 The White Dream (1943)
  Scandal at the Embassy (1950)
 No Sin on the Alpine Pastures (1950)
 The Mine Foreman (1952)
 Ideal Woman Sought (1952)
  Knall and Fall as Imposters  (1952)
 Knall and Fall as Detectives (1952)
 The Bachelor Trap (1953)
 Young Heart Full of Love (1953)
 The Dairymaid of St. Kathrein (1955)
 Marriage Sanitarium (1955)
 Royal Hunt in Ischl (1955)
 The Doctor's Secret (1955)
 The Blue Danube (1955)
 His Daughter is Called Peter (1955)
 Two Bavarians in St. Pauli (1956)
 Her Corporal (1956)
 The Stolen Trousers (1956)
 Forest Liesel (1956)
 War of the Maidens (1957)
 The Poacher of the Silver Wood (1957)
 Candidates for Marriage (1958)
 When the Bells Sound Clearly (1959)
 Final Accord (1960)
 The White Horse Inn (1960)
 Die Fledermaus (1962)
 Dance with Me Into the Morning (1962)
  Wedding Night in Paradise (1962)
 Our Crazy Nieces (1963)
 The Model Boy (1963)

References

External links

1899 births
1987 deaths
Austrian male film actors
People from Břeclav
Austrian film directors
20th-century Austrian male actors